Cássio Werneck is a Brazilian Jiu-Jitsu competitor, instructor and owner of Cassio Werneck Brazilian Jiu-Jitsu located in Sacramento, California.

Early Years 
Werneck began training in martial arts at 11 years old, practicing Capoeira for 4 years. He switched to grappling in 1991, moving to a Judo club where he was coached by sensei Miura. Cassio was exposed to more of the self-defence aspect of  jiu-jitsu through Professor Sardella, a member of the Federal Police. In 1993, Werneck's focus turned to Brazilian Jiu-jitsu.

Teaching career 
Athletes such as Randy Couture, Frank Mir, Dan Henderson and Urijah Faber have also trained under Cassio at his Sacramento location.

Cassio has conducted seminars in the Middle East as well as in the U.S. and Brazil.

Championships

Mixed martial arts record

|-
| Win
| align=center| 2-0
| Ashe Bowman
| Submission (armbar)
| WEC 20: Cinco de Mayhem
| 
| align=center| 2
| align=center| 2:05
| Lemoore, California, United States
| 
|-
| Win
| align=center| 1-0
| Toby Imada
| Submission (triangle choke)
| WEC 15
| 
| align=center| 2
| align=center| 2:54
| Lemoore, California, United States
|

References

External links
 Cassio Werneck Brazilian Jiu Jitsu Academy, Sacramento CA 
 BJJ Instructional Videos 
 

Brazilian male mixed martial artists
Brazilian practitioners of Brazilian jiu-jitsu
People awarded a black belt in Brazilian jiu-jitsu
Lightweight mixed martial artists
Mixed martial artists utilizing Brazilian jiu-jitsu
Living people
Year of birth missing (living people)
World Brazilian Jiu-Jitsu Championship medalists